Vladimir Alekseev may refer to:

 Vladimir Alekseev (admiral) (1912-1999), Russian admiral
 Vladimir Alekseev (mathematician) (1932-1980), Russian mathematician